Russell Paul Wortley is an Australian politician who has served in the South Australian Legislative Council for the South Australian Branch of the Australian Labor Party since the 2006 election. He has served as President of the South Australian Legislative Council from 2014 to the 2018 election.

Early life
Wortley worked as a plumber and gas fitter before being elected as a union official in 1984. He is a former head of the Gas sub-branch of the Transport Workers Union in South Australia. He was a councillor for the Fitzroy Ward of the Prospect City Council from 1987 to 1993. He has served as a member of a number of government and community organisations including the Occupational Health and Safety Commission, the Workers Appeal Tribunal and the Industrial Relations Advisory Committee. He is a Justice of the Peace.

Parliament
First elected at the 2006 election, Wortley was re-elected at the 2014 election for a second eight-year term.

Policy interests include education, health, industrial relations, aged care, environment and natural resources.  Wortley has served in many committees and select committees, and served as Minister for Industrial Relations and State/Local Government Relations from 2011 to 2013.

He served as President of the South Australian Legislative Council from 6 May 2014 until 3 May 2018.

Personal life
Wortley is married to fellow state Labor politician Dana Wortley. They have one son.

References

External links
Parliamentary Profile: SA Labor website
 

|-

|-

|-

|-

Living people
Year of birth missing (living people)
Members of the South Australian Legislative Council
Australian Labor Party members of the Parliament of South Australia
Presidents of the South Australian Legislative Council
Australian trade unionists
21st-century Australian politicians